This is a list of members of the 41st Legislative Assembly of Queensland from 1974 to 1977, as elected at the 1974 state election held on 7 December 1974.

 On 11 February 1976, the Liberal member for Clayfield, John Murray, resigned. Liberal candidate Ivan Brown won the resulting by-election on 11 May 1976.
 On 19 February 1976, the Labor member for Port Curtis, Martin Hanson, resigned due to ill-health, and died the following day. Labor candidate Bill Prest won the resulting by-election on 29 May 1976.
 On 12 August 1976, the Liberal member for Lockyer and Deputy Premier, Sir Gordon Chalk, resigned. Liberal candidate Tony Bourke won the resulting by-election on 16 October 1976.
 On 7 March 1977, the Independent member for Mackay, Ed Casey, who had won twice as an independent after losing Labor preselection ahead of the 1972 election, was readmitted to the Labor Party.
 On 12 May 1977, the Liberal member for Clayfield, Ivan Brown, died. No by-election was held due to the proximity of the 1977 state election. The Clayfield electorate was abolished at the election as a result of an electoral redistribution.

See also
1974 Queensland state election
Premier: Joh Bjelke-Petersen (National Party) (1968–1987)

References

 

Members of Queensland parliaments by term
20th-century Australian politicians